David Holt (26 February 1952 – 15 June 2003) was an English professional footballer who played as a central defender.

He played over 400 matches in the Football League for Bury, Oldham Athletic and Burnley, before retiring in 1983 to start a plastic recycling business. In 1998, he moved to New Zealand to run a courier business. In 2003, he collapsed while on his rounds and died of a heart attack, aged 51. Holt was married to Avrille, and the couple had two sons, Paul and Shaun.

References

1952 births
2003 deaths
People from Padiham
English footballers
Association football defenders
Bury F.C. players
Oldham Athletic A.F.C. players
Burnley F.C. players
English Football League players
English emigrants to New Zealand